Progressives for the Balearic Islands, or simply Progressives, was a Spanish party alliance formed by PSM–Nationalist Agreement, United Left, The Greens and Republican Left of Catalonia to contest the 2004 general election in the Balearic Islands.

Composition

References

Defunct political party alliances in Spain
Political parties in the Balearic Islands